The Hong Kong Vase is a Group 1 flat horse race in Hong Kong which is open to thoroughbreds aged three years or older. It is run over a distance of 2,400 metres (about  miles or 12 furlongs) at Sha Tin, and it is scheduled to take place each year in mid December.

The race was first run in 1994, and it was promoted to Group 1 status in 2000. It is one of the four Hong Kong International Races, and it presently offers a purse of HK$22,000,000  (approximately US$2.8 million).

Records
Speed record:
 2:24.77 – Glory Vase (2019)

Most wins:
 2 – Luso (1996, 1997)
 2 – Doctor Dino (2007, 2008)
 2 – Highland Reel (2015, 2017)
 2 – Glory Vase (2019, 2021)

Most wins by a jockey:
 4 – Olivier Peslier (1995, 1999, 2007, 2008)

Most wins by a trainer:
 3 – Aidan O'Brien (2015, 2017, 2020)

Most wins by an owner:
 3 – Derrick Smith, Susan Magnier & Michael Tabor (2015, 2017, 2020)

Winners

See also
 List of Hong Kong horse races

References
Racing Post:
 Racing Information of Cathay Pacific Hong Kong Vase  (2011/12)
 Website of Cathay Pacific Hong Kong Vase  (2011/12)
 The Hong Kong Jockey Club
 horseracingintfed.com – International Federation of Horseracing Authorities – Hong Kong Vase (2016).
 pedigreequery.com – Hong Kong Vase – Sha Tin.

Open middle distance horse races
Horse races in Hong Kong
Recurring sporting events established in 1994
1994 establishments in Hong Kong
Vase sports trophies